Allentown was a train station in Allentown, Pennsylvania. It was opened by the Lehigh Valley Railroad in 1890 and closed in 1961. The building was demolished in 1972. The station was located one block west of the Central Railroad of New Jersey's Allentown station.

History 
The Lehigh Valley Railroad opened its original line between Allentown and Easton, Pennsylvania in 1855; the first passenger train ran between the two cities on June 11. In 1890 the Lehigh Valley relocated its station to downtown Allentown, just off its main line. The station stood near the intersection of Hamilton and 4th Street, adjacent to Jordan Creek. Named long-distance passenger trains included the Asa Packer (New York City - Mauch Chunk), the John Wilkes (New York City - Wilkes-Barre), the Black Diamond and the Star (New York City - Buffalo) and the Maple Leaf (New York City - Toronto). Each of these had continuing equipment or connecting services to Philadelphia.

The railroad abandoned its remaining passenger trains on February 4, 1961, after years of financial losses and declining patronage. Allentown was one of several passenger-only stations which was closed as a result. The abandoned station was demolished in 1972 to permit the construction of an enlarged road bridge over Jordan Creek.

Service along the former Lehigh Valley route to Allentown resumed in 1978. Conrail, which had taken over the Lehigh Valley's lines in 1976, began operating commuter trains from Allentown to Philadelphia. The service was funded by the federal government and the Pennsylvania Department of Transportation. Trains stopped at a platform at Third and Union Streets in Allentown, approximately a block south of where the Lehigh Valley's station had stood. Service began on July 31, 1978, with four round-trips to Philadelphia. The service was an extension of the Southeastern Pennsylvania Transportation Authority's existing Bethlehem Line trains. The station consisted of a platform, small shelter, and an unpaved parking lot. Service between Allentown and Bethlehem ended on August 20, 1979, amid low patronage and a dispute over the subsidy for the service.

Notes

References

External links 
 

Railway stations in the United States opened in 1890
Railway stations closed in 1961
History of Allentown, Pennsylvania
Buildings and structures in Allentown, Pennsylvania
Transportation in Allentown, Pennsylvania
Former Lehigh Valley Railroad stations
Demolished railway stations in the United States
Transportation buildings and structures in Lehigh County, Pennsylvania
Former SEPTA Regional Rail stations
Former railway stations in Pennsylvania
1890 establishments in Pennsylvania
1961 disestablishments in New York (state)
Buildings and structures demolished in 1972